From Barbarism to Christian Manhood is the debut album of noise rock band King Snake Roost, released in 1987 by Aberrant Records. In 1989, the album was adopted by Amphetamine Reptile Records and re-issued on vinyl.

Track listing

Personnel 
Adapted from the From Barbarism to Christian Manhood liner notes.

King Snake Roost
 Bill Bostle – drums
 Peter Hill – vocals, harp
 Michael Raymond – bass guitar
 Charles Tolnay – guitar

Production and additional personnel
 Caroline Birkett – photography, design
 Dave Boyne – production, engineering

Release history

References

External links 
 

1987 debut albums
Amphetamine Reptile Records albums
King Snake Roost albums